Cuisines of the Axis of Evil and Other Irritating States: A Dinner Party Approach to International Relations is a political satire-based cook book written with a left-leaning point of view authored by C. Christine Fair. Inspired by George W. Bush's 2002 State of the Union address, the book utilizes recipes for dishes from the so-called Axis of Evil countries such as Iran, Iraq and North Korea as well as other nations such as Cuba, Israel and the United States mixed with political humor.

See also 

 War on Terror (game)

References

External links
The official site

Cookbooks
Comedy books